Leicester Lion Cubs are a speedway team that was formed in November 2018 to race in the National League at the Beaumont Park Stadium in Leicester. This team is the second and junior Leicester Lions speedway team racing at this venue.

History
The club experienced success in their inaugural season, when they won the league and cup double during the 2019 National Development League speedway season.

In 2022, the club dominated the season by winning the league, successfully defending their National League Knockout Cup title (from 2019) and winning the Pairs Championship.

Season Summaries

2019
The Leicester Lion Cubs first two signings for the season were the Thompson twins Dan and Joe as their reserves. Ellis Perks was confirmed as the third signing for the Lion Cubs, he would start the season at number 1 and also double up with the first team Leicester Lions. On 18 December 2018, the Lion Cubs announced their next two signings which were Danyon Hume (as captain) and Kelsey Dugard,  with the final two signings confirmed as Luke Ruddick and Jamie Halder.

On 3 January 2019, Leicester confirmed they would be managed by club co-promoter Dave Darcy and he would be assisted by David Howard. Danyon Hume was later named as team captain, on 31 January. Kelsey Dugard was injured following injuries suffered in a crash during the Leicester Press and Practice day on 15 March and was replaced by Ryan MacDonald.

On 28 October 2019, the Lion Cubs won the title after home and away victories in the play-off final against Kent Kings, and on the following evening (29 October) they completed the League and Cup double by winning the National League Knockout Cup with an aggregate victory in the final over the Belle Vue Colts.

2020-2021
After a Challenge match victory away at Scunthorpe 61-53 in their only meeting in the COVID-19 hit 2020 season, the Lion Cubs built a new team for the 2021 National Development League speedway season, with the team building points limit reduced to 35 with a new League focus on youth development.
Only Dan and Joe Thompson returned from the double-winning side of 2019, with Joe Lawlor and Tom Spencer being joined by Jamie Halder and first year riders Ben Trigger and Kai Ward making up the initial 2021 declaration. However, Jamie Halder suffered a broken ankle in an unfortunate domestic fall prior to the first Lion Cubs meeting. After being granted a short term rider replacement facility for Jamie to start the season, a change was needed to be made and a third first year rider, Mickie Simpson joined the Lion Cubs to complete the seven riders. The team had an underwhelming season, Joe Lawlor announced his retirement from the sport and the Lion Cubs ended the 2021 season at the bottom of the NDL. However, all six riders who rode throughout the season showed average increases at the end of season compared to the start of the season.

2022-2023
The team dominated the 2022 season winning the National Development League, National League Knock-out Cup and National League Pairs (Dan Thompson & Joe Thompson). The Thompson brothers returned to head the team for the 2023 National Development League speedway season.

References

	

National League speedway teams	
Sport in Leicester